thumb|upright=1.5|alt=group of people listening to an old-fashioned radio set|Act II, Scene 1: Archie Jenkins (John Molecey), Mr Grainger (Trevor Ward), Alfie Blake (Brian Carey), Janet Braid (Elspeth March), Mrs Grainger (Sybil Wise), Alma Boughton (Helen Horsey), Mr. Lawrence (George Lane), Nora Shattock (Beatrice Varley), Fred Shattock (Bernard Lee) and Doris Shattock (Maureen Pryor)
Peace in Our Time is a two-act play written in 1946 by Noël Coward. It is a work of alternative history, focusing on a group of Londoners in a pub close to Sloane Square, after Nazi Germany has won the Battle of Britain and successfully invaded and occupied the United Kingdom. The work takes inspiration from the real-life sufferings of French citizens during the German occupation of France, which Coward had followed closely.

The play was given a pre-London tryout in Brighton and first performed in the West End at the Lyric Theatre in 1947. The production was directed by Alan Webb under Coward's supervision; it starred performers who became well known including  Kenneth More, Bernard Lee, Elspeth March, and Maureen Pryor. Later in the year the play moved to the Aldwych Theatre to complete its run.

The piece is unusual for its sombre tone, being considerably darker than the comedic approach of most of Coward's plays. It was only a moderate success at its first production, running for 167 performances, but has attracted some attention in later revivals.

Background
Coward wrote that he conceived the idea for the play while in Paris shortly after the Liberation and end of Nazi occupation. He wrote, "The city itself seemed to be unchanging, physically at least untouched by the horrors of enemy occupation. It didn't take me long however to realise that, behind the facade, a great deal had changed; the sense of immediate relief had faded, and there was an atmosphere of subtle disintegration, lassitude and above all suspicion". This led him to wonder "what would have happened to London and England if, in 1940, the Germans had successfully invaded and occupied us, which they so very nearly did". He decided to place the entire action of the play in the bar-parlour of a London pub, as "the most easily manageable meeting-ground for various types of Londoners".

Coward was implacably anti-Nazi; he had despised pre-war appeasers, headed the British propaganda office in Paris until the city fell to the Germans, and was discovered to have been on the Gestapo's list of prominent public figures to be liquidated had the Germans taken Britain. The play takes its title from a popular misquotation: the pre-war British prime minister,  Neville Chamberlain proclaimed after meeting Adolf Hitler at the Munich Conference of 1938, "I believe it is peace for our time". The phrase was frequently quoted as "peace in our time". Coward was advised not to use the phrase for his title, but as his biographer Cole Lesley put it, "Of course he used it, only too delighted to do anything which might anger the pro-Munich lot".

The play was put into rehearsal in 1947. Coward wanted a cast of fresh new talent, and auditioned numerous rising actors including Kenneth More, who accepted a part, and Dirk Bogarde, who did not. Peace in Our Time opened at the Theatre Royal, Brighton on 15 July 1947. The audience gave it an enthusiastic welcome, and it seemed as though Coward had a hit on his hands. Nevertheless, before the London opening Coward revised the text extensively. The play opened at the Lyric Theatre in Shaftesbury Avenue on 22 July. The first night audience received the play with acclaim, but the reviews were generally unfavourable, and Peace in Our Time was not among Coward's longer-running plays. It transferred from the Lyric to the Aldwych Theatre on 29 September and closed in December after a total of 167 performances.

Roles and original London cast

Alma Boughton – Helen Horsey
Fred Shattock – Bernard Lee
Janet Braid – Elspeth March
Doris Shattock – Maureen Pryor
Mr Grainger – Trevor Ward
Mrs Grainger – Sybil Wise
Nora Shattock – Beatrice Varley
Lyia Vivian – Hazel Terry
George Bourne – Kenneth More
A man – Douglas Vine
A woman – Stella Chapman
Chorley Bannister – Olaf Pooley
Bobby Plaxton – Derek Aylward
Albrecht Richter – Ralph Michael
Phyllis Mere – Dora Bryan
Mr Lawrence – George Lane
Maudie – Irene Relph
Gladys Mott – Daphne Maddox

Alfie Blake – Brian Carey
German soldier – Charles Russell
Herr Huberman – Richard Scott
Frau Huberman – Betty Woolfe
First SS guard – Anthony Peek
Second SS guard – William Murray
Billy Grainger – Philip Guard
Doctor Venning  – Michael Kent
Ben Capper – Manfred Priestley
Lily Blake – Dandy Nichols
Mr Williams – William Murray
Stevie Shattock – Alan Badel
Archie Jenkins – John Molecey
Kurt Forster – Michael Anthony
Mrs Massiter – Janet Barrow
Young German soldier – Anthony Peek
Third SS guard – Peter Drury
Fourth SS guard – Douglas Vine

Source: Mander and Mitchenson.

Synopsis

The play is in two acts of four scenes each. The setting is the saloon bar of a London public house called The Shy Gazelle, somewhere between Knightsbridge and Sloane Square.

Act I
The time is November 1940. Britain has been conquered and occupied by Nazi Germany. The Shattock family run the Shy Gazelle, with a clientele mostly of locals. The latter are in general ordinary British people, resentful of German occupation but, to varying degrees, resigned to it. One, Chorley Bannister runs a highbrow magazine and is rightly seen as being too ready to collaborate with the Nazis.

A handsome and well-dressed German, Albrecht Richter, comes into the bar and is cold-shouldered by the other customers. He leaves after one drink. Bannister warns the others that "a little toleration" of the occupiers is simple common sense. Others disagree, and condemn cowardly expediency.

The second scene takes place in June 1941. News of events in Britain, on the radio and reported by customers, include the shooting of Winston Churchill, the State Opening of Parliament by Hitler, an attack on an offensive German officer near the pub and the arrest of a local Jewish tailor by the SS. Richter establishes a friendly relationship with Bannister. Others remain politely hostile, in varying degrees. The most hostile suspect others of being too ready to collaborate.

Scenes 3 and 4 are set in early 1942. The pub's supplies of whisky are running low, but the Shattocks decline Richter's offer to obtain supplies for them. After the pub has closed, Billy Grainger, son of two of the regulars, staggers in. He has escaped from a Nazi prison camp. Dr Venning (another resistance member) is summoned, and takes Billy away to hide him. The Shattocks' son, Stephen, subsequently appears briefly: he is also on the run from the Germans. It emerges that he and his sister Doris are active in the resistance movement.

Act II
It is 1945. The tide of the war has turned. The liberation of France continues and Germany has been defeated at sea. The cellar of the pub has been turned into a base for the resistance. Bannister discovers this, and rushes out. Subsequently, Richter, with two SS guards, comes to arrest Doris. Three days later her broken and dying body is brought back to the pub: as she dies she says she told the Germans nothing. Two months later the British liberation is in full swing. Some of the regulars abduct Richter and bring him in. They tie him to a chair and tell him he is to be "liquidated" for his murder of Doris. Learning that the Germans are coming to rescue him, they put his chair immediately behind the locked door; he is riddled with bullets by his comrades as they shoot the door down. The regulars and the Shattocks escape through the back door while the radio is heard announcing that the liberation is nearly complete.
Source: Mander and Mitchenson.

Critical reception
Harold Hobson in The Sunday Times praised the play, and in The Daily Telegraph, W. A. Darlington wrote, "This play cannot possibly fail. It is too moving, too exciting, too deft – and too timely. We need to be reminded, just now, that we are people of spirit". They were was in a minority of the critics, most of whom wrote lukewarm or hostile reviews.  Some, including Graham Greene were suspected of resenting Coward's depiction of left-wing journalists who collaborated too readily with the Nazis, but other critics, then and later, thought Coward's treatment of the theme fell between two stools: not profound, but not witty enough to make its point by satire.

In the assessment of Coward's biographer Sheridan Morley, the writer had uncharacteristically misjudged his moment:

A 2014 article in the magazine Houstonia after the Houston revival detailed below, judged that the play explored interesting dramatic questions while still maintaining a close feeling of realism, such as how frustratingly "characters grumble about the indignity of foreign occupation, including food and drink rationing". Questions of loyalty and friendship versus survival remained compelling.

Adaptations and revivals 
The play has (at 2020) never been staged on Broadway or revived in the West End. The large cast makes it a difficult undertaking from a commercial standpoint. Productions include that at the off West End King's Head Theatre (1989), a UK tour by the Touring Partnership (1995), the Bristol Old Vic Theatre School (2006) and the Main Street Theater company in Houston (2014).

The only broadcast adaptation listed by the BBC is a 1947 version by Ayton Whitaker, using the cast of the original production.

See also

Hypothetical Axis victory in World War II
Cultural impact of Noël Coward
List of plays by Coward

Notes

References

Sources

External links
Article on BBC
Peace in Our Time on camdram.net

1946 plays
Plays by Noël Coward
Alternate history plays
Plays about World War II
English political plays
World War II alternate histories